Jupudi is a village in Palnadu district of the Indian state of Andhra Pradesh. It is located in Amaravathi mandal of Guntur revenue division. The village forms a part of Andhra Pradesh Capital Region, under the jurisdiction of APCRDA.

Geography 

Demographics 

 Census of India, Jupudi had a population of 2,422, including 1,226 males and 1,196 females with a gender ratio of 976 females per 1000 males. 310 are in the age group of 0–6 years, with a child gender ratio of 902 girls per 1000 boys. The average literacy rate stands at 57.86%.

Government and politics 

Jupudi Gram Panchayat is the local self-government of the village. There are wards, each represented by an elected ward member. The present sarpanch is vacant, elected by the ward members. The village is administered by the  Amaravathi Mandal Parishad at the intermediate level of panchayat raj institutions.

Education 

As per the school information report for the academic year 2018–19, the village has only one MPP school.

References 

Villages in Palnadu district